is a Japanese train simulation game series originally produced by Taito and more recently by Square Enix (who purchased Taito) and Railfan Holdings Co., Ltd. The series started with a 1996 arcade version and was first released in a home version for the PlayStation in 1997. There are also PC versions released by the Japanese publisher Unbalance. All of the games in the series are exclusively available in Japanese.

Overview 
Each Densha de Go title contains actual train (or tram) routes based on real services in Japan. For the most part, the user's task is to drive the train and adhere to a very exacting timetable, including stopping at stations to within as little as 30 cm of a prescribed stopping point, ideally within half a second of the scheduled arrival time. While the specifics vary slightly between versions, generally speaking along the way, the user is expected to obey speed limits and other posted signs, sound a warning for work parties along the track, arrive at between-station waypoints on time, and perform similar tasks.

Densha de Go differ from Ongakukan's Train Simulator series  primarily in that while the Ongakukan series uses video taken from cameras mounted to the front of real-world trains for its graphics, Densha de Go titles rely upon computer-drawn graphics.

History

The 2004 title Densha de Go Final! was so named to signal that it was intended to be the last in the series. While still popular in an absolute numbers sense, the series had lost the novelty of its heyday while development costs for individual titles continued to climb due to the detailed virtual worlds that needed to be created.

Taito and Ongakukan subsequently released a few co-produced titles for PlayStation 2, PlayStation Portable, PlayStation 3, and iOS with the title Railfan. Taito also divided the four routes in Densha de Go! Final into separate titles and released them on the PSP system.

In April 2010, 5 years after Square Enix acquired Taito Corporation as a wholly owned subsidiary, Densha de Go! Special Version -- Revived! Showa Yamanote Line was announced for the Nintendo DS on July 22, 2010. This was a departure from the traditional publisher and distributor of Densha de Go, Taito. Densha de Go! Special Version—Revived! Showa Yamanote Line offers a variety of trains to control, from the early Yamanote Line up through the current rolling stock. Exclusive to the Nintendo DS, the controls are completely stylus driven, unlike the variety of custom controls offered in non-handheld versions.

In June 2011 a version of the game also covering the Yamanote line was released for Apple's iOS (only available in the Japanese App Store). There is the option of using a simulated "master controller" on the screen or using touchscreen buttons to move the lever up and down.

Unbalance, who had long supported the franchise by publishing ports of each title to the Windows platform in Japan for over a decade, discontinued the last of its released Densha de Go! titles from retail as of August 2011. The company had been steadily discontinuing titles beginning with the "1480¥ Series", so-called due to their price point and comprised the earliest titles, in late 2010/early 2011 as supplies depleted. Later-released titles in the series—the "1980¥ Series"—were the last to be discontinued as of August, 2011. A line of custom USB controllers for the series had been discontinued even earlier and now command a large premium on sites such as Yahoo! Auctions Japan. Support through Windows 7 compatibility guides, FAQs and patches remains available through the Unbalance site, however.

In 2017 Taito, which is now owned by Square Enix, released a new arcade cabinet in commemoration of the 20th anniversary of the game series. According to an article from Geek: "The cabinet includes four displays, three of which act as windows showing the track and simulated outside world, whereas the fourth forms the dashboard the player sits at. All the buttons from a real train are present, as are the two physical controls required to make the train move." They also released a new mobile game for Android and iOS in Winter 2016.

Densha de Go! controllers 

A large number of hardware train controllers were available for a number of platforms (PC, PS, PS2, Saturn, Wii, N64, etc.) for which Densha de Go was available. This included versions that had buttons, levers, and pedals to suggest real-world train controllers, including traditional brake-and-throttle train controllers, "mascon"-type controllers (single lever for throttle and brake), shinkansen controllers, and tram controllers (ostensibly similar to the traditional brake-and-throttle style, but with different styling).

One of the most extravagant controllers for the Densha de Go! series was the Shinkansen Controller, which was released with the Densha de Go! Shinkansen EX game for both the Wii and PS2. The Shinkansen Controller for the PS2 comes with a LED screen display of speed and controls and a foot pedal to blow the horn, whereas the Shinkansen Controller for the Wii lacked these features, replacing the LED screen with a representative sticker. The Wii version of this controller commands much higher prices than the PS2 version only by virtue of relative rarity.

Versions

Parodies 
A doujin manga and game series, Densha de D, is a parody crossover of the series in combination with the auto racing-based franchise Initial D; it is popularly associated with a meme regarding "multi-track drifting".

References

External links
Official website for Densha de Go! Special Version -- Revived! Showa Yamanote Line (Nintendo DS) 
Official website for Densha de Go! 
Official website for Densha de Go! Android / iOS game 
Official website of the game series, as provided by Internet Archive 

Video game franchises introduced in 1996
Windows games
Train simulation video games
Square Enix franchises
Taito games
Video games set in Japan
Railway culture in Japan